John Henry Stelle (August 10, 1891 – July 5, 1962) was an American politician who served as the National Commander of The American Legion from 1945 to 1946. He previously served as the 29th Governor of Illinois (1940–41), the 34th lieutenant governor of Illinois (1937–40), and the treasurer of Illinois (1935–37).

Early life 
Born in McLeansboro, Illinois, Stelle attended Western Military Academy, and he earned a law degree from Washington University in St. Louis in 1916. Stelle was a lifelong Democrat who served in World War I in the US Army. He was a delegate to most of the Democratic National Conventions from 1928 to 1960. Stelle's first statewide office was as Treasurer, from 1935–1937. From there, he moved into the spot of lieutenant governor in 1937, keeping that job until Horner's death almost four years later.  As Horner's three-month successor, Stelle served the second-shortest period in office in Illinois gubernatorial history.

Governor of Illinois (1940-1941) 
The new governor, upon moving his family into the governor's mansion, placed an order for thirty-five cases of beer, then directed the rooms housing the Lincoln library be redecorated.  Many nights during Stelle's ninety-nine-day tenure, the mansion was "lit up like a Christmas tree", as thirty to forty guests were often entertained at one time, a number of them friends from Southern Illinois and Springfield. This extravagance involved no overspending, as the entertainment budget had scarcely been touched during Horner's long illness.  As well, Stelle was up early every morning as was his habit, choosing to partake of breakfast in the company of the servants.

Firings and replacements were swift and rampant.  Men who received the axe were often notified in the middle of the night.  Several appointments proved wise, however; one of them, prescient.  George Edward Day, a crony of Stelle's, was made state purchasing agent.  Day, a paint dealer from Springfield, was able to call into being a particular obsession of the new governor's: the painting of yellow lines on highways to indicate areas of unsafe passing.  Day bought vast quantities of yellow paint (from himself), and the traffic safety measure was instituted, making Illinois only the second state to do so (Minnesota was the first).  Gov. Stelle had the mansion repainted as well, at a cost of $1,900 (approximately $33,770 in current dollars).

As the Christmas season neared, over 400 Stelle friends and supporters, were listed as being on the State payroll, and the number climbed until it was no longer possible to corroborate.  Any spending irregularities were never documented, though 13 years later, in 1953, the St. Louis Post-Dispatch remarked on the Stelle government buying a "tremendous amount of equipment, coal and other merchandise".  John Stelle, in contrast to all of this, appeared deeply injured by the comments and accusations of the 1940 press, and Milburn P. Akers, a Horner insider, in fairness blamed not Stelle, but the men around him.  This said, the Stelle administration, among other expenditures, purchased two new Cadillacs that the governor took on drives to Cairo, for weekends of quail hunting.

Patriotic to his bones, John Stelle denounced appeasement as American involvement in Europe drew closer.  With the Illinois National Guard mobilized for federal service, the governor established a reserve militia in its place.  An emergency defense council was put into place, draft boards were appointed and 468 honorary commissions handed out, mostly to politicians.   Stelle's fervent devotion to the military and its role of protection was genuine.  Following his return to the private sector, he helped advocate for the design and passage of the Servicemen's Readjustment Act of 1944, better known as the G.I. Bill of Rights.  According to his citation in the James Bryant Conant Award, "Stelle, a World War I veteran and past national commander of The American Legion, quarterbacked a team of Legion officials that, in the space of just six months, designed and put forth the main features of the GI Bill, organized massive public support and shepherded its successful passage through Congress. Stelle's leadership and behind-the-scens negotiating skills are widely credited for the legislation's surviving stubborn pockets of resistance, intense debate and a conference committee deadlock that nearly scuttled the bill at the 11th hour."

Later life 
Late in life, Stelle was a supporter of John F. Kennedy during his 1960 campaign for President of the United States, and assisted in forming a coalition of supporters from central Illinois. Kennedy, from personal accounts, credited that coalition with helping him win that pivotal state (by a narrow 11,000 vote margin).

John Henry Stelle died on July 7, 1962, at Barnes Hospital, St. Louis, of acute leukemia. Upon his death, Stelle's body was taken back to McLeansboro for a funeral conducted by the Gholson Funeral Home and laid to rest in the McLeansboro City Cemetery.  In 2002, Stelle won the James Bryant Conant Award posthumously from the Education Commission of the States.

The Stelle Mansion, one of the more notable buildings in McLeansboro, caught fire and burned down in 2005, destroying one of the last remnants of Stelle's life.  Stelle's portrait may be found among the members of the Hall of Governors on the second floor of the Illinois State Capitol in Springfield, Illinois.

See also 
List of governors of Illinois
List of members of the American Legion

References

External links 
Stelle's Biography
James Bryant Conant Award

1891 births
1962 deaths
20th-century American politicians
United States Army personnel of World War I
Democratic Party governors of Illinois
Illinois lawyers
Lieutenant Governors of Illinois
National Commanders of the American Legion
People from McLeansboro, Illinois
State treasurers of Illinois
United States Army officers
Washington University School of Law alumni